Lucius Saenius (possibly Lucius Saenius Balbinus) (fl. 1st century BC) was a Roman senator and suffect consul in 30 BC as the colleague of Augustus.

Biography
Ronald Syme notes the gentilicum "Saenius" is "patently Etruscan", and suggests some kind of connection between the senator and the town Saenia Julia (modern Siena). He was probably the son of a senator of the same name who had achieved no high offices. Saenius was considered to be one of the men who owed their career completely to Octavian and whom Octavian could use as a tool for his own purposes. 

In 30 BC, Saenius was appointed consul suffectus. During his time in office he issued the Lex Saenia, which regulated the adlection of plebeians to the patriciate by means of a lex curiata (or law passed by the Curiate Assembly). He also intervened in protecting Junia Secunda, who was accused by Gaius Maecenas of being involved in the conspiracy led by her son, Lepidus the Younger, against Octavian.

References

1st-century BC Romans
Senators of the Roman Republic
Imperial Roman consuls
Saenii
Year of birth unknown
Year of death unknown